Beijing Olympics may refer to:

 2008 Summer Olympics, games of the XXIX Olympiad
 2022 Winter Olympics, games of the XXIV Winter Olympic Games

See also
 Beijing Paralympics (disambiguation)
 Beijing (disambiguation)
 Olympics (disambiguation)